Urawilkie, New South Wales is a remote Rural locality of New South Wales and a civil Parish of Baradine County.

The economy of the parish is a mix of forestry and agriculture with farming in the south of the parish and  the northern portion taken by the Pilliga forest.

References

Localities in New South Wales
Geography of New South Wales